MTV Hits is a 24-hour pop music television channel from Paramount Networks EMEAA launched on 27 May 2014. The channel is widely available throughout Europe, Africa, Latin America and the Caribbean.

History
On 1 October 2017, MTV Hits, MTV Dance and MTV Rocks ceased broadcasting in Benelux.
A localized version of MTV Hits replaced MTV Brand New in Germany on 6 January 2021 and in the Netherlands on 1 February 2021. This version shares the same schedule as the main channel, albeit one hour ahead. The standard MTV Hits channel is also available in Germany from local ISPs.
On 1 June 2021, the channel replaced MTV Music 24 in South Africa. A year after transmission, it was announced that the channel would go off air in the region by 31 October 2022.
On 1 July 2021, MTV Hits stopped broadcast in Russia and CIS countries under the decision of the legal owner.
From February 2023, MTV Hits started adding more 00s hits to the channel's playlist.

Format
MTV Hits is a non-advertisement channel, dedicated to worldwide songs from 10s era and beyond. Occasionally, in special segments, songs from 00s and earlier eras can also be seen.
(Since February 2023, songs from the 00s have been appearing in several programs, e.g. Party Hits!)

Since VH1 Europe 's closure, MTV Hits began creating new segments - top 50, artists' greatest hits, programmes dedicated to the day/month's theme - to fit in for the previous programming of that channel.

Programmes

Regular programming
Non-Stop Hits
Party Hits
Totally 10s!
Today's Top Hits
Worldwide Hits!
Weekend Hitlist
MTV Top 20 (alt. name: MTV Euro Top 20)

Daily specials

Artist: Greatest Hits (alt. name: "In Love with Artist")
Beyonce
Bruno Mars
Coldplay
Drake
Ed Sheeran
Lady Gaga
Rihanna
Selena Gomez
Taylor Swift
Miley Cyrus
Ariana Grande

Top 50
Love Songs Of The 10s!
Love Songs Of The 20s!
Feelgood Love Songs!
Best R&B Love Songs!
Who Run The World? Girls!
 Global Girls Of The 20s

Special
 We Love: 
 Harry Styles
 Justin Bieber
 Global Video Premiere
 The Flipper's Skate Heist

Yearly events

Valentine's Day
Boys In Love!
Girls In Love!
R&B Love Songs!
20s Love Songs!

Women's Day
 International Women's Day Takeover
 Superwomen! 20 Global Girls (March 8, 2022)

Europe Day
Euro Hits!

Pride Month
 Born This Way: MTV Pride
 Love Is Love! Pride Icons

New Year
 Happy New Year from MTV Hits!
 New Year's Party Hits!

Other

August 2022
Isle Of MTV: Malta 2022

September 2022
R'n'b & Hip Hop
Nothing But R&B & Hip-Hop!

October 2022
Keep Fit Hits (only in October 10, 2022)
VMAs
VMAs Hall Of Fame: The Winners!
2022 MTV VMAs
Nominees: The Boys
Nominees: The Girls
The Nominees!

November 2022
I Want My MTV: Joel Corry
EMAs
MTV EMAs: Past Winners!
2022 MTV EMAs
The Nominees
The Boys
The Girls

September 2021
00s
Girls Of The 00s: Biggest Hits! 
Boys Of The 00s: Biggest Hits

October 2021
10s videos
 MTV Hits Most Played Videos Of The 10s
 Going Gaga For Lady Gaga
Iconic 10s Videos That Made MTV

Discontinued

2023
 Artist: Greatest Hits
 David Guetta
 Calvin Harris
 Selena Gomez
 Justin Bieber
Top 50
Superstar 50: The Girls!
Top 50 Stars Of RnB & Hip Hop!
Superstar 50: The Boys!
Superstars Of The 10s

2022

10s Stars Of MTV
 Adam Lambert's Fierce Pride Anthems! 
 Kim Petras' Wooh-Ah! Top 20
 Olly Alexander's Prideography!
 RuPaul's Lip-Sync Extravaganza
 #MTV Hottest
Worldwide Hits
The Contenders
Girls vs. Boys
Global Superstars
The Results
 Top 50
 Biggest Euro Hits!
 Boys Of The 10s
 Collabs Of The 10s
 Euro vs. Worldwide Hits!
 Euro Boys! 50 Global Hits
 Euro Ladies! 50 Global Anthems
 Girls Of The 10s
 Girls Vs Boys! 50 Hot Hits
 Hits Of The 20s!
 Hottest Party Hits!
 Leading Ladies Of The 20s!
 Pop Anthems Vs Dance Hits! Top 50
 Pop Vs Hip-Hop! 50 Global Hits
Love Songs Of The 10s
Biggest Hits Of The 10s!
Stars Of The 10s!
Collabs Of The 10s!
First Class Rap Anthems!
R&B Anthems!
R&B VS Hip Hop Anthems!
Hey Mr DJ! 50 Dance Anthems
 Of The 10s
 Superwomen! 50 Global Girls
 Videos of the 10s
 VMAs Hall Of Fame: 50 Performers!
 Who Run The World? Girls!
 Wonder Women Of The 10s!
 10s Vs 20s Battle! 50 Hits
 Artist: Greatest Hits
 Adele
 Ariana Grande
 Billie Eilish
 Beyonce
 Bruno Mars
 BTS
 Calvin Harris
 Cardi B
 Demi Lovato
 Dua Lipa
 Drake
 Ed Sheeran
 Halsey
 Jonas Brothers
 Justin Bieber
 Kendrick Lamar
 Lady Gaga
 Miley Cyrus
 Nicki Minaj
 One Direction
 Post Malone
 P!nk
 Rihanna
 Sam Smith
 Selena Gomez
 Shawn Mendes
 Taylor Swift
 The Weeknd
Artist vs. Artist
 SZA X Doja Cat
 Harry Styles vs. Zayn
 Coldplay vs. The 1975
 Lil Nas X vs. Kehlani 
Harry Styles X Shawn Mendes
Artist vs Artist vs Artist
 Bruno Mars Vs Charlie Puth Vs Shawn Mendes
 The Weeknd Vs BTS Vs J Balvin
 Olivia Rodrigo Vs Dua Lipa Vs Billie Eilish
 Drake Vs Doja Cat Vs Lil Nas X
 Ed Sheeran Vs Taylor Swift Vs Adele
 Imagine Dragons Vs The 1975 Vs Coldplay
 David Guetta X Calvin Harris X Tiesto
 Justin Bieber X Post Malone X Ariana Grande
 Avicii Vs Calvin Vs Guetta
 Adele vs. Sam Smith vs. Ed Sheeran
 Dua Lipa vs. Zara Larsson vs. Mabel
 Martin Garrix VS Tiesto VS Zedd
Miley Cyrus X Selena Gomez X Demi Lovato
Drake X Nicki Minaj X Post Malone
Maroon 5 X One Direction X Ed Sheeran
J Balvin X Jason Derulo X Bruno Mars
The Weeknd X Rihanna X Ariana Grande
Justin Bieber X Shawn Mendes X Charlie Puth
Taylor Swift x Katy Perry x Adele
MTV Hottest
 Superstars!
 The Weeknd Vs Doja Cat Vs Ariana Grande
 Dua Lipa Vs Justin Bieber Vs Camila Cabello
 Worldwide Super Hits
 Drake Vs Post Malone
 Tiësto Vs David Guetta Vs Calvin Harris
 The Collabs!
 Adele Vs Ed Sheeran Vs Lady Gaga
 Imagine Dragons Vs Coldplay
 Ladies Vs Gentlemen!
 Harry Styles Vs Taylor Swift
 BTS Vs Olivia Rodrigo Vs Lil Nas X
Best Of 2022!
Most Played Top 50
50 Worldwide Hits
Top 50 Collabs
Party Hits Top 50
The Girls
The Boys
Biggest Collabs
Most Played
Dance Hits 
Worldwide Hits
MTV Hits Most Played Videos Of 2022! Top 50

2021

Artist: Greatest Hits
Ariana Grande
Drake
Dua Lipa
Ed Sheeran
J Balvin
Lady Gaga
Shawn Mendes
Taylor Swift
The Weeknd
 Best Of 2021!
Most Played 20 Vids
Most Played 50 Vids
Top 20
Worldwide Hits
Girls
Boys
Collabs
Party Hits
Top 50
Worldwide Hits
Collabs
Party Hits
MTVs 10s Party Zone
 Brand New Vid!
 Artist: Video Premiere
Fresh Vidz And Hot Hits
Nothing But Hits
Non-Stop Pop
Big Fat Hits 
Hits Doubles
Welcome To The Weekend! 
Big in the Lat-AM!
Latin Hits!
MTV Latino Hits
MTV Rewind Hits
Can't Stop The Hits
Newest Vids & Hot Hits!
US Hotlist Top 10
MTV Chart 2000-2009
 This Week's Hottest Hits
 Hot Right Now
 The 10 Biggest Tracks Right Now!
 Pop Superstars
 Wake Up With Hits!

Logos

References

External links
 TV Guide
 MTV Hits Europe - presentation, screenshots
 MTV Hits Germany & Netherlands - presentation, screenshots
 Společnost MTV Networks získala licenci pro tři další kanály

MTV channels
Television channel articles with incorrect naming style
Television channels and stations established in 2014
Television stations in Europe
Television channels in the Netherlands
Television channels in North Macedonia
Music television channels